The Capital Metropolitan Transportation Authority, officially stylized as CapMetro, is a public transportation provider located in Austin, Texas. It operates bus, paratransit services and a commuter rail system known as the Capital MetroRail in Austin and several suburbs in Travis and Williamson counties.

Voters approved the creation of Capital Metro in January 1985, agreeing to fund the organization with a one percent sales tax. Operations began in July 1985 and Capital Metro took over City of Austin bus services in 1986. In 2010, the Capital MetroRail Red line, the agency's first rail service, began operations.

History

Predecessors 

The predecessors of Capital Metro date back to the late 1800's with the establishment of streetcar services in Austin. In 1874, the City of Austin granted the Austin City Railroad Company a franchise for a "horse or mule railroad" on Congress Avenue, Pecan Street (since renamed Sixth Street), and 11th Street. Construction of the line began on Pecan in November 1874 and mule-drawn streetcars began operations in January the next year. The company changed ownership several times until 1889 when it was bought by a group of Boston and Chicago investors who planned to extend services and convert the system to electricity. However, before they could do so a new competitor began operations.

In 1890, real estate developer Monroe M. Shipe received a city charter to operate electric streetcars on city streets. Initially, this covered only roads not already occupied by other track but he later convinced the city council to also allow him to operate on Congress Avenue and Pecan Street. Shipe had started a streetcar suburb venture two and a half miles north of the city called Hyde Park, the destination for the first line. By February 1891, Shipe had built 5 miles of track, a new powerhouse to provide electricity for the line, and began operations as the Austin Rapid Transit Railway Company in places running just a few feet from the mule car tracks.

Just a few months after the electric streetcars started running, an Austin City Railroad mule stable was destroyed in a fire and a few weeks later the company merged into the Austin Rapid Transit Railway leading to the end of mule-drawn service in October. The streetcar service faced challenges over the next years including a lack of power that forced the service to return to mules at several points. In 1897, the company began buying power from the first Austin Dam, which had been completed in 1893, but in 1899 a drought and breakdown of a company-owned powerhouse left them without power for months. Then, in April 1900, the Austin Dam failed catastrophically. Following the dam break, the electric streetcars were again mule-drawn until the company finished building its own power plant.

The Austin Rapid Transit Railway had operated at a loss from 1892 and was in receivership from 1897 until it shut down in 1902 selling its assets at auction to its president, F. H. Watriss. Watriss established the Austin Electric Railway Company in 1902 and the old company was merged into the new one. The new company lasted until 1911 when it was bought by New England investors and renamed the Austin Street Railway Company. In the early 1910s the company faced stiff competition from jitney drivers who would follow streetcar lines offering cheaper service but those disappeared when they were unable to meet a city bond requirement. From the late 1910s into the 1930s, increasing automobile usage cut into streetcar revenue.

Austin Street Railway began offering bus service on certain routes in the late 1920s. At the time, the company was operating 23 miles of track but by 1939 that was down to 17 miles and it was running 29 miles of bus routes. The last streetcar line to operate was the main line which began on Congress Avenue, ran south of the capitol to Lavaca Street, north on Lavaca to 19th street, then west to Guadalupe ending in a loop at Hyde Park. It was replaced by bus service in February 1940 and the same month Austin Street Railway changed its name to the Austin Transit Company.

For the next several decades, the Austin Transit Company was the city's contractor for transportation services. In 1969 and 1970 contentious contract negotiations between the city and the bus operator led to significant changes. In June 1970 the city had granted a franchise to Transportation Enterprises Inc. (TEI) to run a shuttle bus service at the University of Texas. TEI already had contracts from the university to provide bus services. Austin Transit balked at this claiming the city had breached its contract by allowing TEI authority to operate in areas that Austin Transit was already serving. Austin Transit gave the city an ultimatum saying they would cease operations July 31 unless the city bought the company. Instead, the city expanded TEI's contract to cover the rest of the city using school buses which began August 1 after Austin Transit carried through on their threat. However, by November TEI said it was losing  and would have to stop service January 1 forcing the city start subsidizing operations in January 1971.

However, by March 1971 Austin Transit had a new contract with the city and restarted operations now with a city subsidy. The next year, the city created the Austin Transit System, a city agency which began operations in January 1973 with Austin Transit Co. as the operator of the now city-owned system.

Establishment of Capital Metro 

Capital Metro was established by a referendum on January 19, 1985 to provide mass transportation service to the greater Austin metropolitan area. Voters in Austin and the surrounding area approved the creation of the agency, to be funded in part by a 1 percent sales tax. Capital Metro commenced operations on July 1, 1985, and took over the existing city of Austin bus services in 1986.

In an effort to boost ridership, Capital Metro did away with fares completely and instituted fare-free in an experiment that lasted from October 1989 to December 1990. The program was enormously successful in attracting new passengers, and increased ridership by 75% (though expanded service accounted for some of the growth). The fare-free scheme, however, attracted problem riders who drove away quality ridership. In response, 75% of transit drivers voted to have the program discontinued immediately in 1990.

In 1997 Capital Metro was the subject of a string of Texas Legislature and FBI investigations that uncovered a dysfunctional organization beset by poor management. As a result, the Legislature subsequently overhauled Capital Metro and its board of directors in an attempt to make the transit authority both more effective and transparent ahead of a performance review by the Texas Comptroller of Public Accounts. The review cited an "ongoing criminal investigation" by the FBI, "irresponsible management", "expensive, embarrassing mistakes", "dubious contracting and purchasing practices", and $118,000 spent on "food, parties, and presents for its employees" and culminated with, "We have never, in all of the performance reviews we have conducted, seen an agency with such a lack of accountability."

As part of this restructuring, the Legislature ordered Capital Metro to hold an up-or-down referendum on passenger rail. In response, Capital Metro released an ambitious plan that proposed to spend $1.9 billion for a light rail system with 52 miles of track on existing streets. The referendum was narrowly defeated in November 2000 by 2,000 votes, with voters in central Austin tending to favor it, while those outside the city limits did not.

Capital Metro prepared a greatly scaled-back version for voters in November 2004. The updated plan sought to build just one starter line that would run north–south at a cost $90 million. While the project was somewhat marred by construction delays, questions and safety and cost overruns, the Red Line of the Capital MetroRail began service on March 22, 2010.

There have been several passenger injuries that have been reported on Veolia, StarTran and First Transit routes in which First Transit exceeds performance ratings, StarTran in the middle, and Veolia failing to consistently meet performance ratings. A safety review plan has been communicated with Veolia Transportation in 2011. The board of directors have been constantly reviewing ways of improvement for that contractor.

Capital Metro had its first passenger/bus fatality in its operating history on January 30, 2012, when route 383 operated by Veolia Transportation bus struck a pedestrian crossing Braker Lane and Jollyville Road. The next fatality happened on January 29, 2019 when a driver struck Anthony John Diaz while he was cycling near the University of Texas campus.

Capital Metro began bus service to Round Rock in summer 2017. Instead of paying for the services with the 1% sales tax used by Capital Metro participating jurisdictions, Round Rock contracted with Capital Metro to provide services for set costs. In June 2018, Capital Metro began testing driverless buses. If successful the buses would run for free as part of a 12-month pilot program.

In summer 2018, Capital Metro began testing autonomous electric shuttles on Downtown streets. The pilot program tested two driverless bus models from EasyMile and Navya on a route from the Austin Convention Center to the Austin Central Library. Capital Metro is also considering implementing full-size driverless buses, likely to be included on a 2020 transportation referendum.

In spring 2020 at the beginning of the COVID-19 pandemic, Capital Metro scaled back operations to the same level as their standard Sunday schedule. Additionally, UT Shuttles, Night Owl, and Saturday MetroRail services were suspended. A rail replacement bus service, route 455 Leander-Lakeline Shuttle, was operated in place of Saturday MetroRail services. Capital Metro also added mobile scanners to both rear and back doors on most MetroBus vehicles to encourage all-door boarding and thereby social distancing. Most services returned to normal in mid-August 2020.

Funding conflicts 
The source of Capital Metro's funding has been a source of considerable and consistent controversy since the transit authority's founding in 1985. In December 1988, the board of directors voluntarily lowered the sales and use tax to 0.75-cent. In June 1995, the Board of Directors reinstated the sales and use tax to the full one percent effective October 1, 1995, promising to set aside the additional revenue for funding light rail.

Capital Metro, after raising its sale tax from 0.75 percent to 1 percent in 1995, had stockpiled $176 million by the 2000 referendum. When light rail was defeated at the polls in 2000, however, pressure mounted to return the quarter-cent it had been setting aside for rail projects. For years, mass transit detractors had coveted the quarter percentage earmarked for rail projects. Political leaders and organizations, including former Republican state Rep. Terry Keel of Austin, Travis County Commissioner Gerald Daugherty and his anti-rail group Reclaim Our Allocated Dollars (ROAD), wanted the sales-tax money to build projects such as a highway loop around Austin and an east–west freeway. As pressure mounted on Capital Metro, Keel announced his intention to roll Capital Metro's taxing authority back to a half-cent and redirecting the other half-cent to highway construction.

To head that off and keep rail's future prospects alive, the Capital Metro board passed resolutions in the months after the vote making two promises: It would direct $91 million of its existing reserves to local governments for transportation projects, and it would dispense all proceeds that year from a quarter-cent of its tax to those same local governments. That quarter-cent promise was later extended for three more years, eventually amounting to $113 million, for a total of $204 million.

The city of Austin, given that something on the order of 97 percent of Capital Metro sales taxes come from within the city, was to be the primary beneficiary of those promises. Since 2000, at least $106 million of the $204 million promised to Austin and smaller cities such as Manor and Leander. At the same time, however, it was spending more than $300 million on commuter rail, park-and-ride lots, a new maintenance and operations center, and other facilities. As the Great Recession spread to Austin in 2009, tax revenues dried up and Capital Metro had to stop payment on a $51 million loan owed to Austin as part of a 2001 agreement.

Member jurisdictions 

Seven cities participate in the Capital Metro system and pay the associated 1% sales tax. All are in Travis or Williamson Counties:

Additionally, two suburban non-city jurisdictions participate: the Anderson Mill area in Williamson County and Precinct 2, an unincorporated area in north Travis County. Service to rural areas in the counties surrounding Austin is provided by the Capital Area Rural Transportation System (CARTS), a federally funded rural transportation agency which interlines with Capital Metro at several transit centers.

In 2008, Capital Metro voted to approve an interlocal agreement policy that would allow cities or government agencies to hire Capital Metro to provide transit service, without requiring the 1% sales tax. The cities of Round Rock, Pflugerville (an original participating jurisdiction which withdrew in 1999), and Georgetown all have established this type of agreement with Capital Metro though the exact levels and types of service contracted varies widely between them. Currently only Round Rock has such an agreement.

Several other cities were original Capital Metro participants but later withdrew: Cedar Park withdrew in 1999, Rollingwood and West Lake Hills both withdrew in 1988, and Volente withdrew in 2016.

Services 
Capital Metro began as a bus-only transit system when it inherited the bus services of city-owned Austin Transit System at inception. However, it has since diversified and now operates commuter rail services, paratransit services, bike sharing and a number of other transit modes.

Bus services 

Capital Metro's various bus services, which include express bus, bus rapid transit, and university shuttle systems, are by far the agency's most used services representing over 16.6 million of the agency's total 17.8 million boardings in fiscal year 2020. While the majority of bus routes operate within Capital Metro's jurisdictional area, the agency has contracts with cities and organizations to provide services outside its core service area.

MetroBus 

Capital Metro's core fixed route bus service, MetroBus, includes 82 standard routes and 15 high-frequency bus routes . It has several primary categories of routes: Local (Routes 1-99), Flyer (Routes 100-199), Feeder (Routes 200-299), and Crosstown (Routes 300-399). MetroBus also provides contract service to the Austin suburb of Round Rock (Routes 50, 51, and 152) and the University of Texas at Austin UT Shuttle services (Routes 600-699). In addition to its standard and high-frequency routes, MetroBus runs a variety of special service routes (Routes 400-499) including Night Owl overnight buses and E-Bus entertainment-district services among others.

MetroExpress 

MetroExpress services are limited stop bus services that run between Downtown Austin and the far suburbs. Express routes are designated as routes 900–999, and are served by buses in the red MetroExpress livery (though on occasions they may be served by buses in the regular MetroBus livery as well).

MetroRapid 

In January 2014, Capital Metro launched a Bus Rapid Transit service branded MetroRapid, utilizing articulated buses operating in shared lanes with automobile traffic. Service on the first route, MetroRapid North Lamar/South Congress (Route 801), began on January 26, 2014. It replaced existing bus Routes 1L and 1M, as well as the 101 Express, which traveled along the same corridor.

A second route, MetroRapid Burnet/South Lamar (Route 803), serves a total of 24 stations between The Domain and Westgate.  Both the 801 and 803 drew citizen protest until premium fares were discontinued in 2017 and the 801 had also reduced frequency of the then operating 1L/1M.

UT Shuttle 

Since 1989 when it took over operations from the previous, private operators, Capital Metro has operated the University of Texas at Austin's UT Shuttle system. The system is one of the largest university transit systems in the United States and carries over 5.2 million passengers a year. The UT Shuttle network is open to the public but UT students, faculty, and staff receive free transportation on it as well as on all standard MetroBus services. Other passengers pay standard MetroBus fares. UT Shuttle services are seasonal, varying along with the University's schedule.

MetroRail 

Capital Metro's MetroRail provides commuter rail services on a single 9-station, 32-mile route, named the Red line in anticipation of additional rail line development. MetroRail operates the line with 10 diesel-electric rail cars from downtown Austin through the north central and north west areas of the city to Leander, a suburb to Austin's northwest. Since Capital Metro began operating the rail service in 2010, the agency has made significant investments in upgrades to the line, a pre-existing freight line that still carriers freight outside passenger operating hours, and facilities including an expanded Downtown station which opened in October 2020.

In November 2020, Austin voters approved Capital Metro's Project Connect transit development proposal which includes a significant expansion of rail services. The proposal is expected to produce an additional commuter rail line, the Green line, as well as two light rail lines, the Blue and Orange lines. This investment is on top of already-approved spending on two new stations for the Red line.

Other services 
In addition to its core bus and rail operations, Capital Metro operates several additional services:
 Pickup, a low-cost, on-demand rideshare service introduced in 2017. The service is only available in certain areas, primarily those not otherwise covered by MetroBus services. Pickup vehicles are wheelchair accessible and act as a complement to the agency's MetroAccess service.
 MetroBike, a regular and electric bike-share system in Austin as well as a network of private bike parking and shelters at Capital Metro transit centers. The bike-share service was initially introduced as Austin BCycle in 2013 owned by the City of Austin as a franchise of the BCycle national bike sharing network owned by Trek Bicycle. In September 2020, Capital Metro took partial ownership with the remainder still owned by the City. Austin BCycle was rebranded MetroBike, the existing brand for Capital Metro's bike shelter and parking network. Bike Share of Austin, a local nonprofit, has run daily operations since the bike-share system's introduction.
 MetroRideShare,  a vanpool service providing month-to-month passenger van leases for groups of 5-12 people.
 MetroAccess, a door-to-door paratransit service for people with ADA-eligible disabilities. Riders must be certified by Capital Metro as having an eligible disability and live within three quarters of a mile of a Capital Metro bus route or rail station.
 Freight Rail services are offered on the agency's approximately 162 miles of railroad right of way between Giddings and Llano, only a portion of which is used for the MetroRail passenger service. Since 2015, Capital Metro Freight Rail operations have been sub-contracted to Austin Western Railroad, a subsidiary of short-line rail operator Watco.

Fare structure 

Capital Metro operates routes using three different fare classes:
 Local: MetroBus, UT Shuttle, MetroRapid, and Pickup
 Commuter: Local services plus MetroExpress and MetroRail
 MetroAccess: MetroAccess services only except for monthly passes, which cover all services

Several groups are eligible for Reduced Fare IDs issued by Capital Metro entitling them to a discount of half the listed price for fares: seniors 65 and over, Medicare card holders, persons with disabilities, students 6-18 with valid school identification, and active and reserve military with valid ID. No fare is charged for children under 6 accompanied by an adult and emergency or military personnel in uniform. The University of Texas, Austin Community College, and City of Austin employees have contracts established with Capital Metro entitling students, faculty, and staff to ride all Capital Metro services for no charge with valid identification.

Fares can be paid with a physical pass card, QR code or digital ticket on cell phones, or NFC chip-enabled tickets. Except for MetroRail, all services require riders to present a valid pass, ticket, or equivalent upon boarding. MetroRail operates on a proof-of-payment system.

Finances and governance

Board of directors 
In 2010 the total number of board members was increased from seven to eight. The Texas Legislature also reduced the number of elected officials who are required to serve on the board, and instituted new requirements regarding the professional experience of certain appointees. The board consists of three members appointed by the Capital Area Metropolitan Planning Organization, including an elected official; one member representing the small cities in Capital Metro's service area; a member each appointed by the Travis County Commissioners and Williamson County commissioners; and two members appointed by the Austin City Council, in which one must be a member of the Austin City Council.

Labor relations 

As a public entity, Capital Metro is prohibited by Texas law from entering into a traditional collective bargaining agreement with a labor union in the United States. In 1991, however, to comply fully with a state law prohibiting public entities from supervising unionized employees with collective bargaining rights, the Capital Metro board determined that its unionized employees and their supervisors should be transferred to a separate non-profit company. In January 1992, Capital Metro created StarTran, Inc., a private entity that acts as the authority's agent in managing its unionized workforce.

On the other hand, Metro drivers and mechanics are represented by the Amalgamated Transit Union, a major labor union representing workers in the transit system that boasts over 188,000 members representing workers. StarTran and the AUT have in the past had troubled contract negotiations, that most recently resulted in a general strike in November 2008.

In 2008, StarTran voted to begin a general strike, despite the fact that StarTran employees were already the highest paid bus operators in the state. Beginning on November 5, 2008, the strike caused the transit agency to reduce its fixed and paratransit service levels, particularly impacting Austin residents who had to use public transit. During the strike, the agency initially provided only those routes on the contingency map for a reduced number of hours but added others as resources became available.  The Sunset Advisory Commission released its report on Capital Metro in April 2010.

Capital Metro also contracts with two other service providers for bus operations, First Transit, Veolia Transport and the Capital Area Rural Transportation System (CARTS). First Transit provides shuttle service for University of Texas students, faculty and staff.

Budget and ridership

Future expansion 

Plans have been circulating since a failed light rail vote in 2000 on urban rail in Austin. A vote on urban rail, a light rail or a streetcar system, was initially planned to be put to the voters as early as 2012. The light rail expansion plan was presented to voters but failed in 2014.

In  November 2020, Project Connect was approved by voters on the 2020 election ballot. The plan calls for 2 new light rail lines, 1 new bus rapid transit line (which could be converted to light rail in the future), 1 new commuter rail line, new MetroRapid bus routes, new regional park and rides, as well as last mile infrastructure investments.

See also 

Texas Department of Transportation
Dallas Area Rapid Transit
Metropolitan Transit Authority of Harris County

References

External links 

Capital Metropolitan Transportation Authority

Bus transportation in Texas

Passenger rail transportation in Texas
Intermodal transportation authorities in Texas
Transportation in Austin, Texas
Government of Austin, Texas
Bus rapid transit in Texas
Government agencies established in 1985
Transport companies established in 1985
1985 establishments in Texas